Brigitte Lacombe (born December 23, 1950, in Alès) is a French photographer residing in New York City. In May 2009, she published a collection "Lacombe anima/persona" with her photographs covering her work from 1975 to 2008. She widely published in magazines, including the Vanity Fair, Glamour, The New Yorker, GQ, the New York Magazine and The New York Times Magazine.

Lacombe started working at the black and white lab of Elle in Paris when she left school. She went to the 1975 Cannes Film Festival, where she met Dustin Hoffman and Donald Sutherland and started to photograph on film sets. She worked on the movies of Sam Mendes, David Mamet, Martin Scorsese, and others.

References
Brigitte Lacombe, on the Entertainment Weekly website.
Brigitte Lacombe, mini-biography and a conversation on the Charlie Rose Show.

External links
Brigitte Lacombe, personal website.

20th-century French photographers
Portrait photographers
People from Alès
1950 births
Living people
French women photographers
21st-century French photographers
20th-century women photographers
21st-century women photographers